Robert Keith Johnson (born 14 October 1938), known as Keith Johnson, is a writer and software developer. While working as a science teacher he published his first work, starting his career as an author. He left classroom education in 1990 to develop software to support teachers, and to promote physics through the writing of textbooks and associated materials.

Career
Johnson attended Queen Elizabeth Grammar School, Darlington (later Queen Elizabeth Sixth Form College) from 1950 to 1957, before going on to read Physics at the University of Manchester. From there, he taught at Urmston Grammar School and Wilbraham High School, where he was Physics teacher, Head of Physics, Deputy Head, Timetabler, and Acting Headteacher. In 1980 Johnson was appointed District Inspector for Science for Manchester City Council Education Committee, with special responsibility for promoting science in Primary Schools. In 1990 he left this post to pursue his career as a full-time author of physics textbooks.

Books
Johnson has written or co-written over 100 books that have attracted many reviews in independent journals and are referred to in official UK syllabuses and qualifications.

His books on Physics have benefited students at all levels in secondary education.

Software
Johnson has developed software to support teachers in Secondary Schools in the UK and across the world, including TimeTabler  which is a program to help timetablers to schedule their school timetables, Options, StaffCover  and Lesson Loader.

Other achievements
Johnson is a film director recognised by the British Film Institute.

He is an expert on Readability, especially of school text books, and has written articles on this subject for the School Science Review, a journal of The Association for Science Education, and other publications. which has been cited by 52 scholarly articles.

Personal life
Keith Johnson married his wife Ann, an artist, in 1962.  They have 2 children and 3 grandchildren.

He is a committed Francophile who divides his time between his homes in France and England.  He has written about the French Pyrenees and contributed to the book 'Corsavy – Paysages & Visages'.

References

External links
 TimeTabler
 

20th-century English non-fiction writers
Schoolteachers from Greater Manchester
Living people
1938 births
English male non-fiction writers
English science writers
21st-century English writers
Writers from Darlington
English film directors
Alumni of the University of Manchester